Lilia Torriani (30 November 1920 – 22 October 2003) was an Italian gymnast. She competed in the women's artistic team all-around at the 1948 Summer Olympics.

References

External links
 

1920 births
2003 deaths
Italian female artistic gymnasts
Olympic gymnasts of Italy
Gymnasts at the 1948 Summer Olympics
Sportspeople from Genoa